William Henry Washburn (June 1842 – March 24, 1916) was a member of the Wisconsin State Assembly.

Biography
Washburn was born in June 1842, sources have differed on the exact date. During the American Civil War, he served with the 28th Wisconsin Volunteer Infantry Regiment of the Union Army. He was a travelling salesman by trade.

Political career
Washburn was a member of the Assembly in 1879. Previously, he was a Supervisor of Pewaukee, Wisconsin in 1868. He was a Republican.

References

People from Pewaukee, Wisconsin
Republican Party members of the Wisconsin State Assembly
People of Wisconsin in the American Civil War
Union Army soldiers
American salespeople
1842 births
1916 deaths
19th-century American businesspeople